Nebria dilatata is a species of ground beetle in the Nebriinae subfamily that is endemic to Canary Islands.

References

External links
Nebria dilatata at Fauna Europaea

dilatata
Beetles described in 1826
Endemic fauna of the Canary Islands